Lori McNeil and Arantxa Sánchez Vicario were the defending champions but they lost in the second round to Laurence Courtois and Irina Spîrlea.

Nicole Arendt and Manon Bollegraf won in the final 0–6, 6–3, 6–4 against Gigi Fernández and Natasha Zvereva.

Seeds
Champion seeds are indicated in bold text while text in italics indicates the round in which those seeds were eliminated. The top four seeded teams received byes into the second round.

Draw

Final

Top half

Bottom half

External links
 1995 Family Circle Cup Doubles draw

Charleston Open
1995 WTA Tour